Charleys Philly Steaks is an American restaurant chain of Philly cheesesteak stores headquartered in Columbus, Ohio. Formerly known as Charley's Steakery and Charley's Grilled Subs, the franchise was established in 1986 on the campus of The Ohio State University. By 2017 there were 600 locations in 45 states and in 19 countries. Charleys is expected to have doubled in size in 2021. In addition to traditional Philly cheesesteaks, the chain also has other steak based sandwiches and multiple grilled chicken sandwiches, among other grilled sandwiches.

History 
While studying real estate at Ohio State University, Charley Shin worked in his mother's Japanese/Korean restaurant in Columbus, Ohio. A wrong turn on a family trip to New York City resulted in Charley's discovery of the Philly cheesesteak. Charley convinced his mother to take a break, sell the restaurant, and invest her life savings of $48,000 in “Charley’s,” a  restaurant across the street from Ohio State's campus. Charley's first decision in the restaurant was to turn the grill around to face the customers, so they could always see their food being cooked, a move that would later become the trademark of the Charley's Philly Steaks chain.

Gosh Enterprises
Charleys Philly Steaks is a subsidiary of Gosh Enterprises, which is solely owned by Shin. Gosh also owns the Bibibop Asian Grill chain, which had purchased the leases for the defunct ShopHouse Southeast Asian Kitchen chain.

References
Footnotes

General sources

External links 

 Official website

Companies based in the Columbus, Ohio metropolitan area
Fast-food franchises
Restaurants in Ohio
Submarine sandwich restaurants
Fast-food chains of the United States
Restaurants established in 1986
1986 establishments in Ohio
American companies established in 1986